Sona may refer to:

Sona language (Papua New Guinea)
Sona (constructed language)